Francesc Gaset Fris (born 26 April 1947) is a former Andorran sport shooter who competed at the 1980 and 1984 Summer Olympics.

References

Living people
1947 births
Shooters at the 1980 Summer Olympics
Shooters at the 1984 Summer Olympics
Andorran male sport shooters
Olympic shooters of Andorra